James Michael Hughes (born August 11, 1951) is a former Major League Baseball pitcher. He pitched all or part of four seasons in the majors, from  until , all with the Minnesota Twins. His nickname was "Bluegill".

Baseball career
Hughes was selected out of St. Bernard High School (Los Angeles) by the Minnesota Twins in the 33rd round (762 overall) of the 1969 June Amateur Baseball Draft.

References

External links

Major League Baseball pitchers
Minnesota Twins players
Gulf Coast Twins players
St. Cloud Rox players
Orlando Twins players
Wisconsin Rapids Twins players
Lynchburg Twins players
Tacoma Twins players
Tucson Toros players
Albuquerque Dukes players
Baseball players from Los Angeles
1951 births
Living people